Cedarview or Cedar View may refer to:

Places

United States
 Cedarview, Utah, a ghost town in Duchesne County
 Cedar View, Virginia, an unincorporated community in Accomack County

Canada
 Cedarview, Ontario, a community in Lambton County, Ontario
 Cedarview Middle School, Ottawa, Ontario
 Cedarview Road, Ottawa, Ontario

Other uses
 Cedarview (microprocessor)